was a district located in Nara Prefecture, Japan.

As of 2003, the district had an estimated population of 1,913 and a density of 89.60 persons per km2. The total area was 21.35 km2.

Former towns and villages 
 Tsukigase

Merger 
 On April 1, 2005 - the village of Tsukigase, along with the Tsuge (from Yamabe District), was merged into the expanded city of Nara. Soekami District was dissolved as a result of this merger.

Former districts of Nara Prefecture